Nanosized aluminium oxide  (nanosized alumina) occurs in the form of spherical or nearly spherical nanoparticles, and in the form of oriented or undirected fibers.

Properties 

Properties, of the final material, defined as the set of properties of the solid Aluminium oxide  and specific properties of nanostructures.

Properties of nanoscale colloidal alumina particles:
 Small diameter of the particles/fibers (2-10 nm)
 High specific surface area (>100 m2/g)
 High defectiveness of the material surface and specific structure of the nanoparticles (the volume and size of pores, degree of crystallinity, phase composition, structure, and composition of the surface — modification possibility)

Properties of the nanoscale fibers of aluminium oxide: 

 The ratio of length-diameter about 20,000,000:1
 A high degree of orientation of the fibers
 The weak interaction of the fibers among themselves
 Absence of surface pores
 High surface concentration of hydroxyl groups

Production

Methods of obtaining powders of aluminium oxide nanometer scale 

1. Grinding powder alumina particles of a nanometer level (for example, 10-50 nm). For example, using a planetary mill using grinding bodies of size less than 0.1 μm.

2. The decomposition of fresh chemically-synthesized AlOOH or Al(OH)3 to aluminium oxide in the rapid achievement of the temperature of decomposition 175 °C and use for it the pressure of 5 bars within thirty minutes. The sooner of the temperature of decomposition of the hydroxo-compounds of aluminium is achieved, the smaller the resulting particles nano oxide in size.

Alumina nano fibers 
The oxidation of the surface of some liquid metal alloys leads to the formation of loose or porous 3D nanostructures. For the first time this effect was observed in the system aluminium-mercury and published more than 100 years ago
.
The fibers of such kind do not occur in nature and only grown by artificial means. Depending on the method of synthesis can be produced various nanostructures, such as aerogel from oxyhydroxide aluminium (AlOOH or Al2O3*\mathit{n}H2O, where , are easily turned into aluminium oxide) or nano-fibers of aluminium oxide (Al2O3).

At this moment, the main ways of production are:

 The method for selective oxidation of aluminium on the surface of the molten Ga-AI in a humid atmosphere at a temperature of 20 to 70 °C (Method of IPCE RAS)
 The liquid metal technology of synthesis of nanostructural aerogel AlOOH from molten Ga-Bi and Al-Al (Institute of RF IPPE named after A. I. Leipunsky, Obninsk city).
 Growing fiber nano oxide of aluminium on the surface of the aluminum melt (a Method of industrial synthesis, developed and patented by the ANF Technology).

Application 

 Adsorbent (to capture hydrocarbon impurities from the air; for extracting fluorine from a variety of media (the ability of aluminum oxide to chemosensitivity fluorine ions used for the purification of water with increased fluorine content; for vapor recovery of hydrogen fluoride from gases of super phosphate and electrolysis) for brightening solutions in sugar production; to trap solvents; adsorption purification of oils (first transformer); adsorbent for gas and liquid adsorption chromatography (adsorption); for ion-exchange and sediment-sorption chromatography in aqueous solution (ion exchange and precipitation); as an inert carrier during liquid-distribution chromatography)
 Desiccant (for drying of gases (deep dehydration to dew points of -60 °C and below); the preservation of instruments and equipment, and also for such systems as the respiratory valves, tanks, transformers, etc.; to create protective atmospheres during long-term storage of food and pharmaceutical products)
 Sorbent of the ions of metals from solutions of their salts, for example, CsNO3, AgNO3, Ba(NO3)2, Sr(NO3)2, Pb(NO3)2, etc., with the possibility of obtaining of metal oxides on the surface of the fibers during annealing
 Sorbent of radionuclides from wastewaters of nuclear power plants
 Inert (reinforcing) filler
 Ceramics and composites (including composite metals) — high toughness, fire resistance and anti-friction properties, insulating properties. Known use in several products such as burner discharge lamp, the substrate of integrated circuits, shut-off elements ceramic pipeline valves, prostheses, etc.
 Abrasive (composed of means for ultra-fine polishing)
 Refractory (high-temperature component for heat insulation)

In addition to these areas, used as a catalyst and carrier of catalysts. Nanoscale oxide due to the small diameter of the particles/fibers, high specific surface area and activity associated with the defects, and the specific structure of the nanoparticles (the volume and size of pores, degree of crystallinity, phase composition, structure, and composition of the surface) strongly enhances the catalytic properties, and increases the range of massive aluminium oxide as a catalyst.

Literature 

1. Wislicenus, H. Zeitschrift für chemie und industrie der kolloide Kolloid-Z 2 (1908): XI-XX.

2. Vignes, J-L. Mazerolle, L., Michel, D. Key Engineering Materials 132-136 (1997): 432 – 435.

3. Zhu, Huai Yong, James D. Riches, and John C. Barry. γ-alumina nanofibers prepared from aluminum hydrate with poly (ethylene oxide) surfactant // Chemistry of Materials 14.5 (2002): 2086-2093

4. Azad, Abdul-Majeed. Fabrication of transparent alumina (Al2O3) nanofibers by electrospinning // Materials Science and Engineering: A 435 (2006): 468–473.

5. Teoh, Geik Ling, Kong Yong Liew, and Wan AK Mahmood. Synthesis and characterization of sol–gel alumina nanofibers // Journal of Sol-Gel Science and Technology 44.3 (2007): 177–186.

6.

See also 
 Aluminium oxide
 Corundum

References

External links 
Alumina nano fibers properties 

Nanoparticles by composition
Aluminates